The Welsh national basketball team is the basketball side that represents Wales in international competition. They are organised by Basketball Wales, the sport's governing body in Wales.

In 2005, Wales, along with England Basketball and basketballscotland combined forces to form the Great Britain national basketball team, with the target goal to field a competitive team capable of winning medals at the 2012 Summer Olympics in London. England's and Scotland's affiliation to FIBA will end on 30 September 2016, but Wales did not sign the agreement with the British Basketball Federation and FIBA.

Current roster

At the 2016 FIBA European Championship for Small Countries:

|}

| valign="top" |

Head coach

James Bamfield

Assistant coaches
Thomas Guntrip
Andrew Purnell
Azeb Smalley

Physiotherapist
Marc Wheeler

Legend

Club – describes lastclub before the tournament
Age – describes ageon 28 June 2016

|}

International appearances
Wales has yet to appear in a major international basketball event. Currently, Wales is set in FIBA European Championship for Small Countries. The best result there so far has been 2nd place in both 1998 and 2002.

Wales co-hosted the 1978 Commonwealth Basketball Championships with England and Scotland. This was the first such Commonwealth Basketball competition. Wales were coached by former player Paul Kinninmont and Andy Henderson, whilst being managed by Ralph Wills. Despite losing several key players to injury and unavailability, Wales performed creditably both in the pool matches in Cardiff and in the finals at Coventry

Competitions

Performance at Summer Olympics

Performance at FIBA World championships
yet to qualify

Performance at Eurobasket

External links
Basketball Wales
Wales Basketball Records at FIBA Archive

See also
Basketball Wales
Great Britain national basketball team
Sport in Wales
Wales women's national basketball team

References

Basketball in Wales
1956 establishments in Wales
Men's national basketball teams
Basketball
Basketball teams in Wales